Elections to South Ribble Borough Council were held on 4 May 1995. The whole council was up for election and a Labour majority was returned, the Conservatives having lost control of the council. The election saw Tim Farron, future leader of the Liberal Democrats, returned as a councillor for Leyland Central.

Election result

|}

Ward Results

References
 The Elections Centre, South Ribble Borough Council Election Results (PDF)

1995 English local elections
1995
1990s in Lancashire